The Great Indian Kitchen is a 2023 Tamil-language drama film directed by R. Kannan and produced by Durgaram Choudhary and Neel Choudhary under the banner of RDC Media. The film is an official remake of the 2021 Malayalam film of the same name. The film stars Aishwarya Rajesh and Rahul Ravindran in lead roles. The film's music and score is composed by debutant Jerry Silvester Vincent, with cinematography handled by Balasubramaniem and editing done by Leo John Paul.

This is the second collaboration between Balasubramaniem and R. Kannan, after 2008 film Jayamkondaan and Aishwarya Rajesh's first project with R. Kannan. The film predominantly was shot in Chennai.

The Great Indian Kitchen was released in theatres on 3 February 2023. The film was initially scheduled to be released in theatres on 29 November 2022, but got postponed. The film opened to highly positive reviews from critics and audiences.

Plot
A woman tries to cope with the customs and traditions of the family she gets married into. However, her mother-in-law's absence for a few months makes her life miserable with endless household chores.

Cast
Aishwarya Rajesh as Wife, a dancer
Rahul Ravindran as Husband, a teacher
Poster Nandakumar as Appa
Yogi Babu as Husband's friend
Mekha Rajan as Usha
Kalairani as Amma

Production
The film is being directed by R. Kannan. The technical crew includes Leo John Paul and Jerry Silvester Vincent as editor and musician respectively. Meanwhile, Balasubramaniem was brought in for the film's cinematography. Aishwarya Rajesh, Rahul Ravindran and Poster Nandakumar will play the roles essayed by Nimisha Sajayan, Suraj Venjaramoodu and T. Suresh Babu in the original.

Music

The soundtrack of the film was composed by newcomer Jerry Silvester Vincent to lyrics by Kabilan Vairamuthu and Dr. Kiruthiyaa. The album's audio rights were acquired by Sony Music India.The full album was released by Sony Music India on 24 January 2023.

Release

Theatrical
The Great Indian Kitchen was released in theatres on 3 February 2023. The film was initially released theatrically on 29 November 2022, but got postponed. On 10 May 2022, the film was given a "U/A" certificate by Central Board of Film Certification. The trailer of the film was released on 24 October 2022. The distribution rights of the film in Tamil Nadu were acquired by K. K. Ramesh and B. Sakthivelan under the banner of KKR Cinemas and Sakthi Film Factory.

Home media
The post-theatrical streaming rights of the film were bought by ZEE5 while the satellite rights of the film was purchased by Zee Tamil and Zee Thirai. The film digitally premiered on ZEE5 on 3 March 2023.

Reception
Logesh Ramachandran of The Times of India who gave 3.5 stars out of 5 stars after reviewing the film stated that,"The Great Indian Kitchen has stayed true to its original, and we have nothing to complain about its execution". Sirinivasa Ramanujam of The Hindu after reviewing the film wrote "Even though the Malayalam original was consumed by a large audience on OTT platforms, a Tamil version might reach its intent to a newer set of audiences — and that's more than enough to make current-day practitioners of patriarchy sit up and take note". Janani K of India Today who gave 2.5 stars out of 5 stars after reviewing the film stated that,"The minor change in the end act doesn't hold up well, thereby bringing down the desired impact". Chandhini R of The New Indian Express after reviewing the film wrote "But as the credits roll, TGIK reiterates that a woman breaking out of patriarchy and making the people who thrive in the system get a liberal dose of the daily muck of an oppressive 'natural order' will always be satisfying". Chandhini R of Cinema Express who gave 3 stars out of 5 starsafter reviewing the film stated that,"But as the credits roll, The Great Indian Kitchen, with all its problems, reiterates that a woman breaking out of the shackles of patriarchy and making the people who thrive in the system get a liberal dose of the daily muck of an oppressive 'natural order' will always be satisfying".

References

External links
 

2020s Indian films
2020s Tamil-language films
Tamil remakes of Malayalam films
Films directed by R. Kannan